Karl Konrad Åberg (18 January 1890 – 4 November 1950) was a Finnish wrestler. He competed in the middleweight event at the 1912 Summer Olympics.

References

External links
 

1890 births
1950 deaths
Sportspeople from Helsinki
People from Uusimaa Province (Grand Duchy of Finland)
Olympic wrestlers of Finland
Wrestlers at the 1912 Summer Olympics
Finnish male sport wrestlers